"Mary of the 4th Form" is the second single by The Boomtown Rats. It was the first song taken from the band's first album The Boomtown Rats but the single is a different, re-recorded version from that on the album and 19 seconds longer. On French and Dutch releases of the single, "Do the Rat" (B-side of the UK version) was the A-side. The song's theme, of a teacher's sexual attraction to a pubescent girl, who behaves in an overtly sexual manner, was resonated in the Police song "Don't Stand So Close to Me".

"Mary of the 4th Form" peaked at No. 15 in the UK Singles Chart in 1977.

Video performances
In videos of this song, Bob Geldof's performances become more reminiscent of Mick Jagger than of punk rockers, with some shows seeing him in a non-punk pink jacket.

Personnel
 Bob Geldof – vocals
 Pete Briquette – bass, vocals
 Gerry Cott – guitar
 Johnnie Fingers – keyboards, vocals
 Simon Crowe – drums, vocals
 Garry Roberts – guitar, vocals

References

External links
 
 

1977 singles
The Boomtown Rats songs
Song recordings produced by Robert John "Mutt" Lange
Songs written by Bob Geldof
Songs written by Johnnie Fingers
1977 songs
Ensign Records singles